The J. C. Rhew Co. Packing Shed was a strawberry packing house in rural northern White County, Arkansas.  It was located on the south side of Graham Road near its junction with Fuller Road, northeast of Providence.  It was a single-story wood-frame structure, in the shape of a long rectangle divided into six bays, capped by a gable roof and set on concrete piers.  Built about 1939, it was noted for a distinctive floor plan, apparently designed to facilitate the movement of workers through the building.

The building was listed on the National Register of Historic Places in 1992.  It has been listed as destroyed in the Arkansas Historic Preservation Program database.

See also
National Register of Historic Places listings in White County, Arkansas

References

External links
His Hand In Mine, chapter 59, by D.B.Shaw, historical fiction involving Rhew and packing sheds

Agricultural buildings and structures on the National Register of Historic Places in Arkansas
Buildings and structures in White County, Arkansas
Packing houses
National Register of Historic Places in White County, Arkansas